Gaeton Fonzi (October 10, 1935 – August 30, 2012) was an American investigative journalist and author known for his work on the assassination of John F. Kennedy. He was a reporter and editor for Philadelphia magazine from 1959 to 1972, and contributed to a range of other publications, including The New York Times and Penthouse. He was hired as a researcher in 1975 by the Church Committee and by the House of Representatives Select Committee on Assassinations in 1977, and in 1993 published a book on the subject, The Last Investigation, detailing his experiences as a Congressional researcher as well as his conclusions.

Background
Fonzi was born Gaetano Fonzi to Leonora and Gaetano Fonzi, a barber, in Philadelphia on October 10, 1935; he later shortened his first name. He grew up in West New York, New Jersey. He studied journalism at the University of Pennsylvania and edited its daily newspaper, The Daily Pennsylvanian.

Career
Fonzi began his journalism career at the Delaware County Daily Times, before moving to Philadelphia magazine after serving in the army.

In 1967, following a three-year investigation, Fonzi co-authored a  Philadelphia magazine article exposing the activities of Harry Karafin, an award-winning American investigative journalist associated with The Philadelphia Inquirer who sought and accepted payment from potential reporting subjects in order to avoid negative coverage. Karafin was fired and then convicted on 40 counts of blackmail and corrupt solicitation.

In 1970, Fonzi published a book about Walter Annenberg and his publishing empire, which included The Philadelphia Inquirer. In 1972, having helped Philadelphia to its first National Magazine Award, Fonzi left Philadelphia and moved to Miami, where he worked on Miami Monthly and Gold Coast magazines.

In 1975, he was hired by Senator Richard Schweiker as a researcher for the Church Committee into the activities of US intelligence agencies, and in 1977 he was hired as a researcher for the House of Representatives Select Committee on Assassinations (HSCA). According to The New York Times, Fonzi was recruited as an investigator for the HSCA "mainly on the strength of scathing magazine critiques he had written about the Warren Commission and its conclusion that Lee Harvey Oswald had acted alone in killing the president in Dallas on Nov. 22, 1963." Gerald Posner wrote: "Fonzi seems an unusual choice for an inquiry that claimed to be impartial, as he was a committed believer in a conspiracy, having written his first article critical of the Warren Commission in 1966." At the HSCA he focused on the role of Cuban exile groups and the links of these groups with the Central Intelligence Agency (CIA) and the Mafia. Fonzi obtained testimony from Antonio Veciana that Veciana had once seen his CIA contact, who Fonzi established was David Atlee Phillips, conferring with Lee Harvey Oswald. In the course of these investigations Fonzi attempted to contact Oswald's friend George de Mohrenschildt on March 31, 1977; hours later, de Mohrenschildt was dead, an apparent suicide. Fonzi published a 1980 The Washingtonian article on the subject which aroused enough interest from the CIA for it to investigate whether Fonzi had breached his 1978 non-disclosure agreement with the CIA, which he had signed in order to gain access to classified files (it concluded that Fonzi had not). The article later formed the basis for his 1993 book, The Last Investigation.

The New York Times said in 2012 of Fonzi's The Last Investigation that "historians and researchers consider Mr. Fonzi's book among the best of the roughly 600 published on the Kennedy assassination, and credit him with raising doubts about the government’s willingness to share everything it knew".

Publications

Books
 Annenberg: A Biography of Power. New York: Weybright and Talley (1970). .
 UK edition: Annenberg: Ambassador Extraordinary. London: Blond (1979).
 The Last Investigation. New York: Thunder's Mouth Press (1993). .
 Later editions include a foreword by Marie Fonzi (2013) and afterword by Dick Russell (2018).

Articles
 "This Town for Hire." Philadelphia (1968), pp. 52-63. Photos by Francis Laping. .
 "Plutocrats at Sea: The Robber Barons Could Teach Today's Tycoons about Shipping Out in Style," with Christopher Gray. Avenue (1990).

Pamphlets
 City Planning's Tweedy Boss (1960)

Notes

References

1935 births
2012 deaths
American investigative journalists
Writers from Philadelphia
University of Pennsylvania alumni
Researchers of the assassination of John F. Kennedy
The Daily Pennsylvanian people